Ungheni is a municipality in Moldova. With a population of 35,157, it is the seventh largest town in Moldova and the seat of Ungheni District.

There is a bridge across the Prut and a border checkpoint to Romania. There is another border town with the same name in Romania (Ungheni, Iași), on the other side of the Prut River.

History 
The first historical mention of Ungheni dates to 20 August 1462. A railway between Ungheni and Chișinău was built in 1875 by Russia in preparation for the Russo-Turkish War (1877–1878). After World War II, the rail route through Ungheni became the main connection between the USSR and Romania.

Features and attractions

Gustave Eiffel bridge 

In 1876 after the spring flooding of the river Prut, the railway bridge that linked Moldova and Romania was almost destroyed.
The Railways Department invited Gustave Eiffel to Bessarabia (Moldova) to redesign and rebuild the bridge.
Today, it remains a strategic structure under the supervision of border guards.

Media
 Unghiul 
 Expresul de Ungheni
 Euronova TV
 UNGHENI.TV
 Radio Chişinău 93.8 FM
 Vocea Basarabiei 100.1 FM

Natives

 Anatolie Arhire
 Constantin Bejenaru
 Alexandr Braico
 Eugen Carpov
 I. A. L. Diamond
 Natalia Munteanu
 Vanotek

International relations

Twin towns – Sister cities 
Ungheni is twinned with:

  Auce, Latvia
  Dmitrovsk, Russia
  Konin, Poland
  Reghin, Romania
  Vasylkiv, Ukraine
  Winston-Salem, United States
  Mankato, United States
  Cascais, Portugal

Consulates
 – Consulate

Gallery

References 

 Brezianu, Andrei and Spânu, Vlad (eds.) (2007) "Ungheni" Historical Dictionary of Moldova (2nd ed.) Scarecrow Press, Lanham, Maryland, USA, p. 371, 

 
Ungheni District
1462 establishments in Europe
Cities and towns in Moldova
Municipalities of Moldova
Moldova–Romania border crossings
Shtetls
Populated places on the Prut